Annie Seymour Pearson (born 1878) was a women's suffrage activist who ran a safe house for suffragettes evading police.

Personal life
She was married to Arthur, had four children (surviving children were Elsa, Francis and Roland), and lived in York.

Protest, arrest and release
In 1913 she went to protest at the House of Commons, was arrested, charged with obstructing the police,
summonsed to appear in court on 18 January 1913,
and sentenced to a choice of a 40 shilling fine, or time in prison. She opted for prison. Two days later her husband paid the fine and Pearson was released from Holloway.

After release
After returning to York, Pearson received a Women's Social and Political Union (WSPU) prison brooch, and was invited to the next WSPU prisoners' reception where she was thanked for her contribution.

She was interviewed by a reporter from The Yorkshire Herald during which she explained her motivation for travelling to the demonstration and what happened when there.

She later set-up a safe house for suffragettes and supporters, including Harry Johnson.

In popular culture
In 2017 York Theatre Royal and Pilot Theatre staged Everything Is Possible: The York Suffragettes a play about Pearson and other suffragettes.

References

1878 births
British feminists
British women's rights activists
English prisoners and detainees
Edwardian era
Women's suffrage in the United Kingdom
19th-century English people
20th-century English people
English suffragettes
Women's Social and Political Union
Date of birth missing
Year of death missing
Holloway brooch recipients